JHN may refer to:
 Johnstone railway station, in Renfrewshire, Scotland
 Stanton County Municipal Airport, in Kansas